Petz Club (fully known as Petz Club, SOS animaux disparus) is a French/Monegasque animated children's television series created by Dominique Amouyal and Hadrien Soulez Larivière. The series debuted on France 5's Zouzous block on June 30, 2014.

Plot
Petz Club is about a group of three young kids and their dog who find lost pets.

Characters
 Nina is an 8-year-old who created the Petz Club.
 Oscar is a 7-and-a-half-year-old, and is the detective of the group.
 Tim is a 7-year-old, and is the sportiest of the group.
 Marlou is the Petz Club's dog.
 Gilou is a vet who helps the Petz Club with their investigations.

Episodes

note: This table is incomplete and only contains the names for episodes 1-2, 6-9, 12-16, 19-20, 23, 25-29, 36-37, 40-44, 46-48 and 50-51. The titles for episodes 3-5, 10-11, 17-18, 21-22, 24, 30-35, 38-39, 45, 49 and 52 are missing.

Broadcast
Petz Club was broadcast on Radio Télévision Suisse in Switzerland, TFO in Canada from 2016-2017, Minimax in Central and Eastern Europe, Teletoon+ in Poland, and JeemTV.

References

External links

 
 Petz Club on Zouzous

2014 French television series debuts
2010s French animated television series
French children's animated adventure television series
French children's animated fantasy television series
French-language television shows